Ethmia coscineutis is a moth in the family Depressariidae. It is found in South Africa.

References

Endemic moths of South Africa
Moths described in 1912
coscineutis
Moths of Africa